The Canadian Institute of Gemmology (C.I.G.) is a non-profit, post-secondary gemmological educational institution in Canada. The C.I.G. is dedicated to research and advance in education in the field of gemmology. Their mandate is to provide gemmology related training to the jewellery industry and the general public.  

The institute is based in British Columbia, Canada and provides classes, correspondence courses, and sells a variety of gemmological instruments.

References

External links
Canadian Institute of Gemmology website.

Mineralogy